Euphony is the demonstration of pleasant phonaesthetics.

Euphony may also refer to:
 Euphony (Casiopea album) (1988)
 Euphony (Matthew Good album) (1994)
 Euphony Communications Ltd, a telecommunications company